Aleksandr Aleksandrovich Khramov (born 4 February 1989) is a former Russian professional football player.

Club career
He made his Russian Premier League debut on 13 March 2010 for FC Krylia Sovetov Samara in a game against FC Zenit St. Petersburg.

References

External links
 

1989 births
Living people
Russian footballers
Russian Premier League players
PFC Krylia Sovetov Samara players
FC Gornyak Uchaly players
Association football defenders